Muiryfold was one of the Roman fortifications built by Septimius Severus in northern Caledonia (modern-day Scotland).

Discovery and excavation
The site was discovered by aerial photography in 1959, and two small trenches were excavated across the north west and south east sides by Kenneth St Joseph the same year.

History
In 210 AD, the Emperor Septimius Severus made an attempt to conquer all Caledonia reaching the Moray Firth. He created a huge marching camp at Muiryfold, near the one created in 84 AD by Agricola at Auchinhove.

The possibility that Agricola and Septimius Severus reached the northernmost area of Scotland can be confirmed by discoveries north of Inverness, specifically at Portmahomack on the Dornoch Firth, and Tarradale on the north shore of the Beauly Firth.

The Roman legions in the first and second century established a chain of very large forts at Ardoch, Strageath, Inchtuthil, Battledykes, Stracathro and Raedykes, taking the Elsick Mounth on the way to Normandykes before going north to Glenmailen, Bellie, Balnageith and Cawdor.

Notes

Bibliography
 
 Frere, S. Britannia: a History of Roman Britain. Londra, 1998. 
 Hanson, W S (1980) The first Roman occupation of Scotland, in Hanson, W S and Keppie, L J F Roman Frontier studies 1979: Papers presented to the 12th International Congress of Roman Frontier Studies, Brit Archaeol Rep, International, vol.S71, 1 Oxford 15-43
 Moffat, Alistair. Before Scotland: The Story of Scotland Before History. Thames & Hudson. Londra, 2005. 
 St Joseph, J K (1961) Air reconnaissance in Britain, 1958-60, J Roman Stud, vol.51 123

See also
 Cawdor (Roman Fort)
 Deers Den
 Inchtuthil
 Pennymuir Roman camps
 Normandykes
 Ythan Wells
 Gask Ridge

Archaeological sites in Moray
Roman auxiliary forts in Scotland